Darren Oliver (born 1 November 1971) is a former English  footballer who played as a defender.

Oliver spent 6 years at Burnden Park before moving to Rochdale for £30,000 in 1993.

References

1971 births
Living people
English footballers
Association football defenders
Rochdale A.F.C. players
Altrincham F.C. players
English Football League players